The 2020–21 Pittsburgh Panthers men's basketball team represented the University of Pittsburgh during the 2020–21 NCAA Division I men's basketball season. The Panthers were led by third-year head coach Jeff Capel and played their home games at the Petersen Events Center in Pittsburgh, Pennsylvania as members of the Atlantic Coast Conference.

The Panthers finished the season 10–12, 6–10 in ACC play, to finish in twelfth place.  They lost to Miami in the first round of the ACC tournament.  They were not invited to either the NCAA tournament or NIT.

Previous season
The Panthers finished the 2019–20 season 16–17 overall and 6–14 in ACC play, finishing in a tie for thirteenth in the conference.  The Panthers defeated Wake Forest in the first round of the ACC tournament before losing to NC State in the second round.  The tournament was cancelled before the Quarterfinals due to the COVID-19 pandemic.  The NCAA tournament and NIT were also cancelled due to the pandemic.

Offseason

Departures

Incoming transfers

2020 recruiting class

Roster

}

}
}

Schedule and results

Source:

|-
!colspan=9 style=| Non-Conference Regular season

|-
!colspan=9 style=| ACC Regular season

|-
!colspan=9 style=| ACC tournament

Rankings

*AP does not release post-NCAA tournament rankings^Coaches did not release a Week 2 poll.

References

Pittsburgh Panthers men's basketball seasons
Pittsburgh
Pittsburgh
Pittsburgh